Ladigesocypris mermere, also known as the Izmir minnow, is a species of ray-finned fish in the family Cyprinidae.
It is found only in Turkey.
Its natural habitats are rivers, intermittent rivers, and freshwater springs.
It is threatened by habitat loss. Ladigesocypris irideus is the other member of the genus according to Fishbase.

References

Ladigesocypris
Endemic fauna of Turkey
Fish described in 1960
Taxonomy articles created by Polbot